Alexandra Tóth may refer to:

 Alexandra Tóth (footballer, born 1990) (born 1990), Hungarian footballer (MTK) in the Hungary women's national football team
 Alexandra Tóth (footballer, born 1991) (born 1991), Hungarian footballer (Viktória FC)
 Alexandra Toth (sprinter), see Austria at the 2018 European Athletics Championships